Fides is a feminine given name. People with the name include:

Fides Benini (1929–?), Italian former swimmer
Fides Cuyugan-Asensio (born 1931), Filipino operatic soprano
Fides Romanin (1934–2019), Italian cross-country skier

Feminine given names